Wallace A. Ross (1923–1974) was the founder of The Clio Awards.  He was an advertising executive in New York City from the late 1940s through the early 1970s  and was responsible for improving the quality, creativity, and innovation of American television and radio advertising during the "Mad Men" era.

Education
Ross attended Cornell University on the G.I. Bill, and graduated in 1944, after serving in the Philippines as an Infantry First Lieutenant and War Correspondent in WWII. At Cornell he was the co-editor of the university newspaper, the Cornell Daily Sun.

Early career
After college, Ross worked as a publicist for Madison Square Garden, and as the Promotions Manager of the Schwerin Research Corporation in New York City (quality testing of programs and commercials for leading broadcast advertisers), as well as the publicist for the International Swimming Pool Company and its president, Esther Williams. During this time he also served as the Vice President of Box Office Television, Inc. the closed circuit large screen theater and hotel television production company headed by Sid Caesar.

The Ross Reports 
In 1949 Ross founded The Ross Reports, a monthly digest that compiled information on casting directors, agents, managers, production companies, and upcoming film and television productions for the NYC theater and television community. Ross was the publisher and editor of The Ross Reports until 1954.

Film Producers Association 
In 1954 Ross became one of the founding members and the Executive Director of the Film Producers Association of New York. The FPA was an association of a number of New York City producers of documentaries, industrial films, and commercials, formed for easier negotiation with trade unions involved in the production of films. The FPA entered their films in the annual Cannes International Advertising Festival every year until 1959, when Ross founded the American Television Commercials Festival and Clio Awards that same year.

Clio Awards 
In 1959, Ross founded the American Television Commercials Festival and The Clio Awards, and he served as the Managing Director of the Festival until 1971. The name "Clio" means the proclaimer, glorifier and celebrator of accomplishments, and is the name of the Ancient Greek Muse of History. The design of the statuette given to winners of the Clio was inspired by the  Brancusi sculpture called "Bird in Space," which Ross originally viewed at the New York Museum of Modern Art.  Ross held a contest to choose the name for the statue, and "Clio" was the name suggested by a Professor of Classics. The statuette was designed by Georg Olden, VP of McCann Erickson's Center for Advanced Practice.

International Advertising Association 
In 1973, Ross became the Executive Director of the International Advertising Association, a position he held until his death one year later.

Bibliography 
Editor and Publisher, Clio Awards Magazine, 1960–71. 
Editor and Publisher, Best TV Commercials of the Year, 1967; Hastings House Publishers, NY. Library of Congress Catalog Card Number: 66030413.
Editor and Publisher, Best TV and Radio Commercials of the Year, Vol. 2; 1968, Hastings House Publishers, NY.

References

External links
Film Producers Association of New York
International Advertising Association

External links 
 International Advertising Association: http://www.iaaglobal.org/
 TV Guide #957, "The Clio Awards," by Neil Hickey; July 31 – Aug 6, 1971; page 4.
 "On the Schwerin Analyses of Advertising Effectiveness"; J. E. Fothergill and A. S. C. Ehrenberg; Journal of Marketing Research; Vol. 2, No. 3 (Aug., 1965), pp. 298–306: 

1923 births
1974 deaths
Cornell University alumni
United States Army personnel of World War II
American expatriates in the Philippines
American advertising executives
United States Army officers
American war correspondents of World War II